The Hekla  Sound  is a sound in King Frederick VIII Land, Northeast Greenland. Administratively it is part of the Northeast Greenland National Park zone.

History
The sound was named by the ill-fated 1906-1908 Denmark expedition after ship Hekla.

Geography 

The Hekla Sound branches to the NW of the Dijmphna Sound at Cape Marie Dijmphna, separating the shore of Lynn Island from the southwestern shore of Holm Land with the southern end of the Princess Caroline-Mathilde Alps to the north. Further west it bends roughly southward, with Skallingen in the Greenland mainland to the west, joining again with the Dijmphna Sound.

See also
List of fjords of Greenland

References

External links 
Properties of the waters sampled in Dijmphna Sound
Explanatory notes to the Geological map of Greenland

Sounds of North America
Straits of Greenland
Fjords of Greenland